TOP or T.O.P. may refer to:

Music
 T.O.P, a South Korean rapper
 T.O.P. (Tower of Power album), 1993 soul/funk album
 T.O.P. (Shinhwa album), 1999 pop album
 "T.O.P.", a 1999 song by S.E.S. from the album Prime: S.E.S. the Best
 "T.O.P.", a 2021 song by G Herbo from his album 25
 Top One Project, a Filipino band

Political parties
 Tobago Organisation of the People, a political party in Tobago
 The Opportunities Party, a political party in New Zealand

Other uses
 Tedcastles Oil Products, an Irish petrol company
 Test Of Proficiency-Huayu, a Chinese language proficiency test
 Tongan paʻanga (ISO 4217 code), the currency of Tonga
 Topsham railway station (National Rail station code), Devon, England
 Technical Office Protocol, a computer networking standard later merged with Manufacturing Automation Protocol
 Time of possession, in American football